The Lady Cop is a fictional police officer, a comic book character published by DC Comics. She debuted in 1st Issue Special #4 (July 1975), and was created by Robert Kanigher and John Rosenberger.

The Lady Cop is Liza Warner, a young woman who watches from beneath a bed as a murderer in cowboy boots slaughters her two roommates, leaving the ace of spades behind as his calling card. Later a policewoman (circa 1975) praises her eidetic memory, calling her a "born police officer". Liza enrolls in the unnamed metropolitan city's police academy, performing her civic duty while hoping to one day find the mysterious "killer in boots". After a long absence, Liza Warner appeared in The All-New Atom #6 and #12, now as chief of police for Ivy Town.

Liza Warner appeared in the fourth and fifth seasons of Arrow, portrayed by Rutina Wesley.

In other media
Liza Warner appears in Arrow, portrayed by Rutina Wesley. This version is a former police sergeant for the Star City Police Department and a member of its anti-vigilante task force who goes rogue following the events of the third season and Quentin Lance disbands the latter group. Throughout the episodes "Beyond Redemption" and "The Sin-Eater", Warner clashes with Team Arrow, with the latter episode seeing her join forces with China White and Carrie Cutter in a failed attempt at taking over Star City.

See also
Police Woman

References

External links
Cosmic Teams: Lady Cop
Seven Hells: Lady Cop Week
A tongue-in-cheek examination of 1st Issue Special #4

DC Comics martial artists
DC Comics female characters
DC Comics police officers
Fictional characters with eidetic memory
Fictional forensic scientists
Fictional American police detectives
Comics characters introduced in 1975
Characters created by John Rosenberger
Characters created by Robert Kanigher